Love versus Money is the third studio album by Australian rock band Noiseworks. It contained the Top 10 hit "Hot Chilli Woman". It is their most commercially successful album.

Amongst the well-known names that contributed to the album were Snap! singer Penny Ford, Vika Bull and Michael Hutchence of INXS. The album also contained a tribute to frontman Jon Stevens's late mother who had died from cancer, the song was titled "R.I.P. (Millie)".

This was the final studio album for phase one of Noiseworks as they disbanded shortly afterwards. However, in December 2007, lead singer Jon Stevens announced that Noiseworks, who had reformed earlier that year (minus keyboardist Justin Stanley), were returning to the studio in 2008 to record their first album together in sixteen years.

Track listing

Personnel
 Steve Balbi – bass, vocals
 Kevin Nicol – drums
 Stuart Fraser – guitar, vocals
 Justin Stanley – keyboards, vocals
 Jon Stevens – lead vocals

Additional
 Penny Ford – backing vocals ("Jealousy (Is a Curse)")
 Shauna Jensen – backing vocals ("Liberty Bell")
 Dorian Holley, Niki Haris, Rodney Saulsberry, Yvone Williams, Alex Brown, Bridgette Bryant, Fred White and Darryl Phinnessee – gospel choir ("R.I.P. (Millie)", "Day Will Come")
 Michael Hutchence – vocals ("Take You Higher")
 Vika Bull – vocals ("Take You Higher")
 Randy Jackson – producer

Charts

Certifications

References

1991 albums
Noiseworks albums
Albums produced by Randy Jackson